Darul Uloom Al-Arabiyyah Al-Islamiyyah, better known as Darul Uloom Bury, was established in 1979 and is the oldest Islamic seminary in the United Kingdom. Located in Holcombe, Bury, it is based on the Dars-e-Nizami syllabus found throughout the world. It was founded by Hadhrat Moulana Yusuf Motala.

Programme
It accepts students from the age of 11 to 23, providing a secondary school education for younger students as well as Islamic education to an advanced level.

History

The school was founded in 1979 by Shaykh Yusuf Motala, a British Indian scholar. Initially, the Saudi Arabian government helped with finances, as it received no money from the state, and parents paid fees of £440,000. It was Europe's first exclusively Muslim school and started with just 80 pupils. Now the institution educates over 300 boys. 

In 2015 Ofsted highlighted the Darul Uloom Al Arabiya Al Islamiya as a good example of a school "promoting British values, preventing radicalization and protecting children".

Lecturers

Previous lecturers have been:
Hadhrat Moulana Yusuf Motala - Founder & Shaikhul Hadith, Teacher of Sahih al-Bukhari
Moulana Naushad Abdul Aziz - Teacher of Sunan Ibn Majah
Moulana Sufi Muhammad Tahir - Teacher of Muwatta Imam Malik & Tahawi Sharif
Mufti Ibrahim Raja - Teacher of Tafsir al-Jalalayn

Notable alumni
Abdur Rahman ibn Yusuf Mangera
Abu Yusuf Riyadh ul Haq
Muhammad ibn Adam Al-Kawthari

See also
Darul Uloom Al-Madania
Darul Uloom London
Darul Uloom Zakariyya
Madinatul Uloom Al Islamiya
Mazahirul Uloom Saharanpur
Jamiatul Imam Muhammad Zakariyya

References

External links
Ofsted inspection reports

Islamic schools in England
Deobandi Islamic universities and colleges
Private schools in the Metropolitan Borough of Bury
Educational institutions established in 1973
1973 establishments in England
Ramsbottom
Islam in England
Metropolitan Borough of Bury